Het Zwartland is a hamlet of the village Zemst-Bos, in Flemish Brabant, Belgium. It is part of the municipality of Zemst.

Name 
Its name literally means The Blackland. This is because the ground is darker and more fertile than in the rest of the region.

Gallery 

Populated places in Flemish Brabant